Cecil Henry Wilson (8 September 1862 – 7 November 1945) was a British pacifist Labour Party Member of Parliament (MP).

Biography
Born in Mansfield, Nottinghamshire, the son of Liberal Party Member of Parliament for Holmfirth, Henry Wilson, Wilson attended Wesley College, Sheffield and the Victoria University of Manchester.

In 1903 Wilson was elected to Sheffield City Council for the Darnall ward, a seat he held until 1924.  He became a Justice of the Peace in 1907.  He also joined the National Anti-Gambling League, coming to chair it by the early 1920s.  From 1919 until 1922 Wilson was the Labour group leader on Sheffield City Council.

At the 1922 general election, Wilson was elected MP for Sheffield Attercliffe.  He held the seat until the 1931 general election, when he narrowly lost to the Conservative Party candidate Cecil Frederick Pike.  However, he retook the seat at the 1935 general election.  Wilson resigned on 7 February 1944 due to ill health, and died in November the following year in Westminster aged 83.

References
Michael Stenton and Stephen Lees, Who's Who of British MPs: Volume III, 1919-1945

External links 
 

1862 births
1945 deaths
Labour Party (UK) MPs for English constituencies
Politics of Sheffield
Alumni of the University of Manchester
UK MPs 1922–1923
UK MPs 1923–1924
UK MPs 1924–1929
UK MPs 1929–1931
UK MPs 1935–1945
English pacifists
People from Mansfield
People educated at Wesley College, Sheffield
Anti-gambling advocates
Parliamentary Peace Aims Group